Hashem Beikzadeh (born January 22, 1984, in Tehran) is a former Iranian football defender and assistant coach of Baadraan Tehran F.C.

Club career
Beikzadeh is a product of the Fajr Sepasi youth academy and since his promotion to the first team squad for the 2005/06 season has been one of Fajr's most important and influential players. He moved to Esteghlal and won the league in his first season but did not play in many matches. On 8 July 2014, Beikzadeh signed a contract extension with Esteghlal, keeping him at the club until 2016. On 26 July 2015, he joined Saba Qom after terminating his contract with Esteghlal.

Club career statistics

1 Statistics Incomplete.

 Assist Goals

International career
He debuted for Team Melli in August 2006 in a friendly match against UAE. Beikzadeh was again called up to the Iran national football team for the West Asian Football Federation Championship 2007 held in Amman, Jordan. He scored his first goal for Iran on June 24, 2007, in a 2–1 final match win versus Iraq.
He was called for Team Melli again for 2010 FIFA World Cup Qualifying. He played against Kuwait as a left back. On 1 June 2014, he was called into Iran's 2014 FIFA World Cup squad by Carlos Queiroz. He was an unused substitute in the tournament, losing his spot to Mehrdad Pooladi because of injury. He was called into Iran's 2015 AFC Asian Cup squad on 30 December 2014 by Carlos Queiroz. He was replaced by Mohammad Reza Khanzadeh due to injury days before the first match in Australia.

International goals 
Scores and results list Iran's goal tally first.

Personal life
He is married and has two daughters, Beikzadeh is originally Iranian Azerbaijani from Ardabil Province.

Honours
Esteghlal
Iran Pro League (2): 2008–09, 2012–13

Sepahan
Iran Pro League (2): 2010–11, 2011–12

Zob Ahan
Hazfi Cup (1): 2015–16

References

External links

 
 
 Hashem Beikzadeh at TeamMelli.com
 Hashem Beikzadeh at PersianLeague.com 
 
 
 

1984 births
Living people
Iranian footballers
Iran international footballers
Association football midfielders
Fajr Sepasi players
Esteghlal F.C. players
Sepahan S.C. footballers
Sportspeople from Tehran
2014 FIFA World Cup players
Saba players